Live After Death is a live album by English heavy metal band Iron Maiden, originally released in October 1985 on EMI in Europe and its sister label Capitol Records in the US (it was re-released by Sanctuary/Columbia Records in the US in 2002 on CD and by Universal Music Group/Sony BMG Music Entertainment on DVD). It was recorded at Long Beach Arena, California and Hammersmith Odeon, London during the band's World Slavery Tour.

The video version of the concert only contains footage from the Long Beach shows. It was initially released though Sony as a "Video LP" on VHS hi-fi stereo and Beta hi-fi stereo with 14 songs and no special features and was reissued on DVD on 4 February 2008, which coincided with the start of the band's Somewhere Back in Time World Tour. In addition to the complete concert, the DVD features Part 2 of The History of Iron Maiden documentary series, which began with 2004's The Early Days and continued with 2013's Maiden England '88, documenting the recording of the Powerslave album and the following World Slavery Tour.

Background
Iron Maiden's World Slavery Tour began in Warsaw, Poland on 9 August 1984 and lasted 331 days, during which 187 concerts were performed To tie in with their 1984 album, Powerslave, the tour's stage show adhered to an ancient Egyptian theme, which was decorated with sarcophagi and Egyptian hieroglyphs, and mummified representations of the band's mascot, Eddie, in addition to numerous pyrotechnic effects. The theatricality of the stage show meant that it would become one of the band's most acclaimed tours, making it the perfect backdrop to their first live double album and concert video.

For the Live After Death video, the band hired director Jim Yukich to film two shows of their four-night run at Long Beach Arena, California from 14 to 17 March 1985.

The double LP was also recorded at Long Beach, although side four contains tracks recorded at Hammersmith Odeon, London on 8, 9, 10 and 12 October 1984. Bassist Steve Harris has stated that, even if they had had the time, they would not have added any studio overdubbing to the soundtrack: "We were really anti all that, anyway. We were very much, like, 'This has got to be totally live,' you know?"

The album has received consistent critical praise, with reviewers hailing it one of the genre's best live albums. For the band, the release was advantageous as it meant they could delay the recording of their next studio album, 1986's Somewhere in Time. Time off was beneficial for the band, who desperately needed to recuperate following the World Slavery Tour's heavy schedule.

Recorded dates
According to Harris, while the video used footage from two nights at Long Beach, the audio version is only made up of one performance, although no exact dates are specified. However, during "Running Free" on the audio version, vocalist Bruce Dickinson refers to it being the fourth concert at the venue, which should mean that the audio version was recorded on Sunday, 17 March. On the video version, after "2 Minutes to Midnight", Dickinson refers to it being "night number two" (Friday, 15 March), while on the documentary 12 Wasted Years, "The Trooper" and "The Number of the Beast" are said to have been recorded on Saturday, 16 March.

Cover art 
The cover art, by Derek Riggs, pictures the band's mascot, Eddie, rising from a grave. Engraved on his tombstone is a misquote from fantasy and horror fiction author H. P. Lovecraft's The Nameless City:

The original Lovecraft text has an "and" instead of a "yet".

Also engraved on the headstone is what appears to be Eddie's full name, "Edward T H--", the remainder of which (his supposed surname, "Head") is obscured by a clump of sod.

The depiction of Eddie follows continuity from previous artworks. His long hair is restored and he sports the metal screw cartouche from his Piece of Mind lobotomy, which is being struck by lightning. He is also bound by metal cuffs connected by an electrical surge, as seen in Powerslave tour promotional artwork.

The back cover depicts the rest of the graveyard and a city being destroyed by lightning, which Riggs states was inspired by John Martin's painting, The Destruction of Sodom and Gomorrah. Death appears in the clouds above the destroyed city; the character is a regular feature of Riggs' covers (such as "Twilight Zone", "The Trooper", Powerslave and Somewhere in Time).

Near Eddie's grave is a black cat with a halo, which also features in the Somewhere in Time and "Twilight Zone" artworks. This, said Riggs, was "not about anything really" and was added "to get people's attention". To the cat's left is a tombstone engraved with "Here lies Derek Riggs". Riggs also included gravestones that state "Live With Pride", added at the band's request to show opposition to lip-synched performances, "Here Lies Faust In Body Only", the German legend who sold his soul to the Devil (hence "in body only"), and a stone that simply reads "Thank You", representing the Grateful Dead.

The sleeve was hung in the studio where Florence and the Machine recorded their debut album Lungs. "Some of the songs on my album are like gothic horror shows," said singer Florence Welch. "So, yeah, Iron Maiden massively influenced the album, quote-unquote!"

The poster is shown on the episode of The Walking Dead, season 10 episode 22 "Here's Negan". It can be seen above Lucille and Negan's bed.

Intro 
The intro before "Aces High" is a part of the We shall fight on the beaches speech made by Winston Churchill in the House of Commons on 4 June 1940. (Churchill re-recorded the speech – the original speech in the House of Commons was not recorded.):

It was later used for their Ed Hunter Tour, Somewhere Back in Time World Tour, Maiden England World Tour, and the Legacy of the Beast World Tour.

Critical reception 

Live After Death has been highly rated by critics since its release; Kerrang! and Sputnikmusic both agree that it is "possibly the greatest live album of all time", while AllMusic describes it as  "easily one of heavy metal's best live albums".

Sputnikmusic argues that it is the band's best live album, concluding that "Iron Maiden's 1985 release has everything you could ask for. With, exciting renditions of classic songs, and brilliant performances, Live After Death is quite a fun listen." PopMatters describes it as "a searing, 102-minute collection of Maiden at [their] peak ... an absolute treasure for fans [which] went on to be universally regarded as an instant classic in the genre".

The album's video counterpart received similar critical acclaim, with AllMusic stating that "Live After Death is a visual pleasure as much as a sonic one. The elaborate staging and lighting effects are excellent. The editing is superb as well [with] very few rapid-fire, seizure-inducing camera cuts". The bonus features included in the 2008 DVD reissue were also praised by PopMatters, Kerrang! and About.com.

The album has also been described by Classic Rock as "the last great live album of the vinyl era."

Track listing

The first 13 tracks were recorded at Long Beach Arena in Long Beach, California, from 14 to 17 March 1985. The last five songs were recorded earlier on the same tour, at the Hammersmith Odeon in London on 8, 9, 10 and 12 October 1984. The Live After Death video was also recorded at Long Beach Arena, but on different nights than the audio.
The 1985 CD edition includes only the first 13 tracks due to CD length restrictions, and merges the intro track into the second, for a total of 12 tracks. A few tracks are also shortened, most notably "Running Free", which is missing the entire audience participation middle section, thus reducing its length to only 3:24 from its full 8-minute runtime. A 1995 re-release features this same truncated version of the concert, but comes with an additional CD containing the B-sides from the Live After Death single releases.
The 1998 and 2020 remastered CD reissues include the full concert in its original length, plus the additional tracks from side four on a second CD.
The video releases contain the 13 tracks included with the audio releases and closes with "Sanctuary". The DVD version features a bonus disc that includes The History of Iron Maiden – Part 2: Live After Death, the second part of an ongoing documentary series about the history of the band, Behind the Iron Curtain feature, promo videos and additional footage from various concerts, as well as a gallery of artwork and photos.

Personnel
Production and performance credits are adapted from the album, VHS and DVD liner notes.

Iron Maiden
 Bruce Dickinson – vocals, guitar on "Revelations"
 Dave Murray – guitar
 Adrian Smith – guitar, backing vocals
 Steve Harris – bass guitar, backing vocals
 Nicko McBrain – drums

Production
Martin "Live Animal" Birch – producer, engineer, mixing
Mick McKenna – assistant engineer (Hammersmith)
Charlie McPherson – assistant engineer (Hammersmith)
Ricky Delena – engineer (Long Beach)
Nick Basich – second engineer (Long Beach), second mixing engineer
Wally Traugott – mastering
Derek Riggs – sleeve illustration, sleeve concept
Ross Halfin – photography
Steve Joule – sleeve design
Rod Smallwood – management, sleeve concept
Andy Taylor – management
Simon Heyworth – remastering (1998 edition)
 Jim Yukich – director (video)
 Matthew Amos – director ("The History of Iron Maiden" documentary)
 Joe Abercrombie – editor ("The History of Iron Maiden" documentary)
 Dave Pattenden – producer (DVD)

Chart performance

Album

1985 VHS

2008 DVD

Singles

Notes

Certifications

Audio

1985 VHS

2008 DVD

References

Iron Maiden live albums
1985 live albums
EMI Records live albums
Live heavy metal albums
Iron Maiden video albums
1985 video albums
EMI Records video albums
2008 video albums
Live video albums
Albums produced by Martin Birch
Albums recorded at the Hammersmith Apollo

pl:Live After Death#Film